Bolesatine is a glycoprotein isolated from the Rubroboletus satanas (Boletus satanas Lenz) mushroom which has a lectin function that is specific to the sugar binding site of D-galactose. It is a monomeric protein with a compact globular structure and is thermostable. One tryptophan can be found in its primary sequence along with one disulfide bridge.

Bolesatine causes gastroenteritis in humans and, at high enough concentrations, inhibits protein synthesis. It does not inhibit protein synthesis directly. Instead, it acts as a phosphatase for nucleoside triphosphate, particularly for GTP. At lower concentrations, it is a mitogen to human and rat T lymphocytes. Studies have shown that at low concentrations, protein kinases C (PKC) are activated in vitro and in vero cells, leading to an increase in DNA synthesis activity.

Effects of Bolesatine Poisoning 
Other than the accumulation of toxins in human liver and organs, Bolesatine poisoning causes agglutination in human red blood cells and platelets at threshold concentrations. The following symptoms of hypertension and dizziness would be expected when affected. In serve cases, death may result.

References 

Lectins
Glycoproteins
Mycotoxins